Beaucarnea olsonii is a plant in the family Asparagaceae, native to Mexico. The species is named for the botanist Mark E. Olson.

Description
Its gray bark is scaly. Its inflorescences bear whitish flowers.

Distribution and habitat
Beaucarnea olsonii is endemic to Mexico, where it is found in Puebla and Oaxaca.

Conservation
Beaucarnea olsonii has been assessed as endangered on the IUCN Red List. It is threatened by conversion of its habitat for agriculture and human settlement and by fires. The species does not occur in any protected areas.

References

olsonii
Endemic flora of Mexico
Flora of Puebla
Flora of Oaxaca
Plants described in 2016